The normal way that a computer functions manually is through a person that controls the computer. An individual generates computer actions with the use of either a computer mouse or keyboard.  However the latest technology and computer innovation might allow a computer to not only detect body language but also respond to it. Modern devices are being experimented with, that may potentially allow that computer related device to respond to and understand an individual's hand gesture, specific movement or facial expression.

Relating to computer science

Being able to read body language is an example of artificial intelligence. As stated by the man who came up with the term, John McCarthy, artificial intelligence is "the science and engineering of making intelligent machines".  In relation to computers and body language, research is being done with the use of mathematics in order to teach computers to interpret human movements, hand gestures and even facial expressions. This is different from the normal way people generally communicate with computers for example with the click of the mouse, keyboard, or any physical contact in general between the user and the computer.

Background information on research being done

MIAUCE and Chaabane Djeraba

This type of research is being done by a group of European researchers and other scientists as well. There is also a project called MIAUCE  (Multimodal interactions analysis and exploration of users within a Controlled Environment). This project has scientists working on making this sort of new advance in computer technology a reality. Chaabane Djeraba, the project coordinator stated "The motivation of the project is to put humans in the loop of interaction between the computer and their environment."

Aims and motives of this project

Researchers and scientists are trying to use their innovation and ideas in a way that can help them apply these modern technological devices to the daily needs of businesses and places people visit such as the mall or an airport. The project coordinator of MIAUCE stated "We would like to have a form of ambient intelligence where computers are completely hidden…this means a multimodal interface so people can interact with their environment. The computer sees their behavior and then extracts information useful for the user." This specific research group has developed a couple of different real life models of computer technology that will use body language as a means of communication and way to function.

Prototypes created by scientists and researchers

General personal use

Scientists and researchers experimented with people and computers. A certain number of volunteers were gathered to test out if computers could function by interpreting what the individual was physically doing without actually having to touch the computer itself. In this specific experiment researchers asked the volunteers to try to control the computer using nothing but their eye movement. The science behind this involves the use of electrooculography, also referred to as EOG. This is basically a technique used to examine someones eye movements. This is then made into a cursor on the computer screen for the individual, in this case the volunteers. The volunteers were then shown a display on the computer screen of the letters in the alphabet. With their eye movements, the volunteers were now able to use this cursor on the computer screen and perform tasks such as typing words.

Security purposes in busy and overcrowded areas

An example of the applied version of this computer technology is controlling the safety of people in heavily populated areas such as bus terminals, airports or even shopping complexes. To monitor such places you definitely need a security camera at the site itself. However, researchers are trying to make use of computers to manage such areas aside from just video cameras alone. Basically a video stream is evaluated and examined which involves a bit of math, for example a description of shapes, the flow of people and their movements. Then that data is analyzed in terms of crowd density, their pace and the direction in which they are moving.  At last is when the use of the computer comes in. The computer aids in evaluating any type of activity in these types of crowded areas that seems fairly irregular. The information that the computer gives will help provide an alert or warning that something is not going the way it should. In the example of a mall, this sort of computer will provide an alert to something like an individual that has fallen from an escalator.

Marketing purposes

Helping businesses and local stores analyze how their customers behave while shopping is another example of how this type of computer technology will be implemented. The scientists and researchers that are creating a computer that runs on this type of technology are making use of the idea of body language being used to work with computers for reasons relating to marketing purposes. This involves monitoring how many people there are in the street next to that certain shop as well as the use of a heat map generator. The heat map generator will basically allow the manager or staff at a store to observe how exactly people are moving. It will also allow staff workers to see what things in the store are attracting the attention of the customers the most.

Controversy and privacy concerns

Although this sort of technology does seem helpful and practical, certain issues and concerns arise among everyday people who are doubtful about how such computers are going to be used.  Some people debate on the issue of security and privacy with such computer technologies. With this new technology comes a bit of concern with the public. Therefore, researchers and scientists have to take into perspective that such computer devices that can read body language have to give people a warning of that kind of a capability. So when building and putting into effect this type of computer, so to say as a means of security, there has to be concern over whether or not to take into consideration if this kind of computer technology would be accepted by the general public. That includes people who are possibly going to be observed and monitored by a kind of computer that analyzes their body movements and gestures when they are doing something as simple as shopping at a mall or traveling through airports.

See also
Emotion recognition
Facial recognition system
Facial Action Coding System
Machine translation of sign languages
3D pose estimation

References
 Moursund, David. Brief Introduction to Educational Implications of Artificial Intelligence. Oregon: Dave Moursund, 2006. Print.
 Braffort, Annelies. Gesture-based Communication in Human-computer Interaction: International Gesture Workshop, GW '99, Gif-sur-Yvette, France, March 17–19, 1999 : Proceedings. Berlin: Springer, 1999. Print.
 Fred, Ina. "Gates: Natal to Bring Gesture Recognition to Windows Too." Cnetnews 14 July 2009: 1. http://news.cnet.com. Ina Fred, 14 July 2009. Web. 18 Nov. 2010. <http://news.cnet.com/8301-13860_3-10286309-56.html>.
 Hansen, Evan. "Building a Better Computer Mouse." CNET News. CNET, 2 Oct. 2002. Web. 20 Nov. 2010. <http://news.cnet.com/2100-1023-960408.html>.
 Unknown. "How Computers Can Read Body Language." EUROPA - European Commission - Homepage. 22 Oct. 2010. Web. 22 Nov. 2010. <http://ec.europa.eu/research/headlines/news/article_10_10_22_en.html>.
 Braffort, Annelies. Gesture-based Communication in Human-computer Interaction: Proceedings. Berlin [etc.: Springer, 1999. Print.
 Yang, Ming-Hsuan, and Narendra Ahuja. Face Detection and Gesture Recognition for Human-computer Interaction. Boston: Kluwer Academic, 2001. Print.

External links
 Computers Detecting Body Language
 Artificial Intelligence
 John McCarthy
 Subfields of Computer Science
 Online Artificial Intelligence Resource
 Computers and Gestures
 Mathematics and Computer Science
 https://web.archive.org/web/20110717201127/http://www.faculty.iu-bremen.de/llinsen/publications/theses/Alen_Stojanov_Guided_Research_Report.pdf
 http://www.physorg.com/news/2010-11-human-computer-music-links-musical-gestures.html
 

Human–computer interaction